"Sunshine" is the fourth single released from American rapper Twista's fourth album, Kamikaze. The song did not find success in the US, but in the UK, "Sunshine" peaked at number three on the UK Singles Chart. "Sunshine" features R&B singer Anthony Hamilton and was produced by Red Spyda.

Composition
"Sunshine" heavily samples Bill Withers' 1977 hit, "Lovely Day." The Twista track begins with a lengthy sample of "Lovely Day"; additionally, the chorus is a reworded version of the original Withers chorus.

Track listings

Australian CD single
 "Sunshine" (album version featuring Anthony Hamilton)
 "Front Porch" (featuring Danny Boy)
 "Legit Ballers"

European CD single
 "Sunshine" (explicit album version featuring Anthony Hamilton)
 "Legit Ballers" (LP version with the Speedknot Mobstaz)

UK 12-inch single
A1. "Sunshine" – 3:44
A2. "Sunshine" (instrumental) – 3:44
B1. "Overnight Celebrity" (remix featuring Bump J and Cam'ron—explicit) – 3:29
B2. "Legit Ballers" – 5:18

UK CD1
 "Sunshine" (edited album version featuring Anthony Hamilton) – 3:44
 "Front Porch" (featuring Danny Boy) – 5:20

UK CD2
 "Sunshine" (explicit album version featuring Anthony Hamilton) – 3:44
 "Sunshine" (instrumental) – 3:44
 "Overnight Celebrity" (remix featuring Bump J and Cam'ron—explicit) – 3:29
 "Sunshine" (album version video) – 3:44
 "Slow Jamz" (video) – 3:34

Charts

Certifications

Release history

References

Twista songs
2004 singles
2004 songs
Anthony Hamilton (musician) songs
Atlantic Records singles
Songs written by Bill Withers
Songs written by Twista